Nathan Hale (16 August 1784 – 9 February 1863) was an American journalist and newspaper publisher who introduced regular editorial comment as a newspaper feature.

Life and career
Born in Westhampton, Massachusetts, Hale graduated from Williams College in 1804, and then was a tutor for two years at Phillips Exeter Academy. He moved to Boston, where he was admitted to the bar in 1810, and practiced law for four years. He began to co-edit The Weekly Messenger in 1813 and founded the Boston Daily Advertiser that same year, serving as editor and publisher until his death in 1863. Hale was one of the founders of the North American Review in 1815 and the Christian Examiner in 1823. In 1842, he was asked by the firm of Bradbury, Soden and Company to suggest an editor for a new monthly magazine they were planning to publish, The Boston Miscellany; Hale named his 21-year-old son, Nathan Hale, Jr., as its founding editor. Hale was active in promoting industrial improvement, especially the Boston and Albany Railroad and diverting the Lake Cochituate for potable water in the Back Bay, the Neck and the South Cove.

His alliance to the Federalist Party continued until its dissolution, after which Hale sided with the Whig Party and eventually the Republican Party. He opposed the Missouri Compromise, the Kansas-Nebraska Bill, and Scott v. Sanford. Hale served in the Massachusetts State Legislature.

In 1819, Hale was elected a Fellow of the American Academy of Arts and Sciences. He was also an active member of the Massachusetts Historical Society.

Publications
He published a map of New England in 1825, and a series of stereotype maps on a plan of his own invention in 1830, being the first maps with names printed in page with type made by the founders. He also published Journal of Debates and Proceedings in the Massachusetts Constitutional Convention (Boston, 1821), and numerous pamphlets on the practicability of railroads, on canals, and other topics.

Family
He married Sarah Preston Everett (sister of Edward Everett) in 1816. Their children included Sarah Everett Hale, Nathan Hale, Jr. (12 November 1818 in Boston - 9 January 1871), Lucretia Peabody Hale, Edward Everett Hale, Charles Hale, Alexander Hale, and Susan Hale. Nathan, Sr., was also the nephew of the Revolutionary War hero, hanged by the British as a spy, Nathan Hale.

References

1794 births
1863 deaths
People from Westhampton, Massachusetts
Fellows of the American Academy of Arts and Sciences
Nathan Hale
American people of English descent
Massachusetts Federalists
Massachusetts Whigs
19th-century American politicians
Massachusetts Republicans
Writers from Boston
19th-century American people
Boston Daily Advertiser people